Tripura is a state of India that has produced a wide variety of folk music. The musician Hemanta Jamatia gained major renown beginning in about 1979, when he became a musical representative for the separatist Tripura National Volunteers. He later on surrendered and returned to normal life, dedicating his work to the folk music of the Tripuri people. In recognition of his contributions to folk and modern music in the Tripuri language, he was awarded the highest honour in the field of music by the Government of India's Sangeet Natak Academy.

Tripuri folk music
Tripuris use musical instruments like the kham made of wood and animal skin, the Sumui (flute) made of bamboo, Sarinda, Chongpreng, Dangdu and cymbals are very famous and popular among indigenous Tripuri people.

References 

 
Tripura
Tripuri music